"Linger" is a song by Australian recording artist Guy Sebastian featuring American rapper Lupe Fiasco. It was released as the fourth single from Sebastian's seventh studio album, Madness (2014). "Linger" peaked at number 17 on the ARIA Singles Chart and was certified platinum by the Australian Recording Industry Association for shipments exceeding 70,000 shipments.

Release and promotion
Sebastian performed "Linger" on Today in December 2014. An acoustic version of the song was also released on Vevo on December 8, 2014.

Music video
On December 1, 2014, Guy Sebastian announced via Instagram that he would be releasing a video to "Linger" soon.
The video premiered on January 12, 2015.

Track listing
Digital download
"Linger" – 4:13

Charts

Weekly charts

Year-end chart

Certifications

References

2014 singles
Guy Sebastian songs
Sony Music Australia singles
2014 songs
Songs written by Guy Sebastian
Songs written by Lupe Fiasco
Songs written by Matt Rad
Song recordings produced by Matt Rad